Rhabdoblennius is a genus of combtooth blennies found in the Pacific Ocean, mostly in the western Pacific. The name of this genus is derived from the Greek word rhabdos meaning "stick" or "rod" and blennius meaning "mucus", referring to the absence of scales on the body of blennies.

Species
There are currently five recognized species in this genus:
 Rhabdoblennius nigropunctatus Bath, 2004 
 Rhabdoblennius nitidus (Günther, 1861) (Barred-chin blenny)
 Rhabdoblennius papuensis Bath, 2004
 Rhabdoblennius rhabdotrachelus (Fowler & Ball, 1924) (Barchin blenny)
 Rhabdoblennius snowi (Fowler, 1928) (Snow's rockskipper)

References

 
Taxa named by Gilbert Percy Whitley
Salarinae